Nick Lower (born 23 June 1987) is a retired Australian rules football player who played for  in the Australian Football League between 2006 and 2009,  from 2011 to 2012, and  in 2013.

Lower attended Saint Ignatius' College, Adelaide before moving to Prince Alfred College with twin brother Ed.

Having ended his football career Nick now works as a real estate agent in Melbourne.

Playing career
Lower is noted for his pace, competitiveness and strength. He has mostly played on a half back flank but has the versatility to be an on-baller as well.

He played junior football for club team Walkerville before playing with South Australian National Football League (SANFL) club Norwood in 2005 before being selected at number 30 by Port Adelaide in the 2005 AFL draft.

Lower was delisted by Port Adelaide at the end of the 2009 season.

He played his first two games for Fremantle in a NAB Cup double header against Hawthorn and West Coast on 14 February 2011.  After performing well throughout the 2011 preseason, he was elevated to the senior list as a nominated rookie and was named to make his debut for Fremantle in the opening round of the 2011 AFL season against Brisbane at the Gabba.

He was delisted by Fremantle at the end of the 2012 season and signed with the Western Bulldogs as a delisted Free Agent on 3 December 2012. From 2013 onwards he fitted into the Bulldogs team as a tagger. Lower was delisted by the Western Bulldogs at the end of the 2013 season.

On 7 February 2014, Lower and Lukas Markovic were named the inaugural captains of the newly established VFL club, the Footscray Bulldogs.

References

External links

1987 births
Living people
Norwood Football Club players
People educated at Prince Alfred College
Port Adelaide Football Club players
Port Adelaide Football Club players (all competitions)
Australian rules footballers from South Australia
Australian twins
Twin sportspeople
Fremantle Football Club players
Perth Football Club players
Western Bulldogs players
Williamstown Football Club players